Myrmoxenus is a genus of ants in the subfamily Myrmicinae. The genus was synonymized under Temnothorax by Ward et al. (2015), but the change was not accepted by Heinze et al. (2015) due to insufficient available data.

Species

Myrmoxenus adlerzi (Douwes, Jessen & Buschinger, 1988)
Myrmoxenus africana (Bernard, 1948)
Myrmoxenus algeriana (Cagniant, 1968)
Myrmoxenus bernardi (Espadaler, 1982)
Myrmoxenus birgitae (Schulz, 1994)
Myrmoxenus corsica (Emery, 1895)
Myrmoxenus gordiagini Ruzsky, 1902
Myrmoxenus kraussei (Emery, 1915)
Myrmoxenus ravouxi (André, 1896) Ravoux's slavemaker ant
Myrmoxenus stumperi (Kutter, 1950)
Myrmoxenus tamarae (Arnol'di, 1968)
Myrmoxenus zaleskyi (Sadil, 1953)

References

External links

Myrmicinae
Ant genera
Taxonomy articles created by Polbot